Camila Valle (born July 7, 1995) is a Peruvian rower. She placed 31st in the women's single sculls event at the 2016 Summer Olympics.

Categories: Senior and light weight.

References

1995 births
Living people
Peruvian female rowers
Olympic rowers of Peru
Rowers at the 2016 Summer Olympics
21st-century Peruvian women